The 1997 season was Club de Regatas Vasco da Gama's 99th year in existence, the club's 82nd season in existence of football, and the club's 27th season playing in the Brasileirão Série A, the top flight of Brazilian football.

Players

Pre-season and friendlies

Trofeo Teresa Herrera

Competitions 
Times from 1 January to 15 February 1997 and from 6 October to 31 December 1997 are UTC–2, from 16 February 1997 to 5 October 1997 UTC–3.

Brasileirão Série A

League table

Matches

Championship phase

Group stage

Finals

Copa do Brasil

Campeonato do Estado do Rio de Janeiro

Taça Guanabara

League stage

Final

Taça Rio de Janeiro

League table

Matches

Terceira Taça

League table

Matches

Championship phase

Supercopa Libertadores

Preliminary round 
Group

Group stage 
Group C

Torneio Rio de Janeiro – São Paulo

Statistics

Squad appearances and goals 
Last updated on 21 December 1997.

|-
! colspan=18 style=background:#dcdcdc; text-align:center|Goalkeepers

|-
! colspan=18 style=background:#dcdcdc; text-align:center|Defenders

|-
! colspan=18 style=background:#dcdcdc; text-align:center|Midfielders

|-
! colspan=18 style=background:#dcdcdc; text-align:center|Forwards

|}

Notes

References

External links 

CR Vasco da Gama
Club de Regatas Vasco da Gama seasons
Vasco da Gama